The Tōrere River is a river of the eastern Bay of Plenty Region of New Zealand's North Island. It is also known to the local Ngaitai tribe as Wainui or Large River.

The Ngaitai tribe cite the river in their historical records.

 Ko Kapuārangi te maunga (Kapuārangi is the mountain)
 Ko Wainui te awa (Wainui is the river)
 Ko Tainui te waka (Tainui is the canoe)
 Ko Hoturoa te tangata (Hoturoa is the man)
 Ko Torerenuiarua te whare tipuna (Torerenuiārua is the ancestral dwelling)
 Ko Manaakiao te whare rangatira e whangaitia ana (Manaakiao is the chiefly dwelling)
 Ko Ngaitai te iwi (Ngaitai is the tribe)

The Tōrere River plays a significant role in the daily lives of the people that live in the area providing water for crop irrigation and stock. In addition to this it also plays a significant role in providing indigenous food staples such as eels, whitebait, and kokopu and introduced species such as brown trout and rainbow trout.

See also
List of rivers of New Zealand

References

Rivers of the Bay of Plenty Region
Rivers of New Zealand